Ethem Ercan Pülgir (born 2 April 1993) is a Turkish professional footballer who plays as a defender for İnegölspor. He made his Süper Lig debut on 4 May 2014.

International career
Pülgir represented Turkey at the 2013 FIFA U-20 World Cup.

References

External links
 
 
 

1993 births
Sportspeople from Samsun
Living people
Turkish footballers
Turkey youth international footballers
Turkey under-21 international footballers
Association football defenders
Kartalspor footballers
Bursaspor footballers
Kayseri Erciyesspor footballers
Adanaspor footballers
Kahramanmaraşspor footballers
Diyarbakırspor footballers
İnegölspor footballers
Süper Lig players
TFF First League players
TFF Second League players
TFF Third League players